Geumcheon District (Geumcheon-gu) is one of the 25 gu (districts) of Seoul, South Korea. It was created from southern parts of Guro-gu and tiny sections from Gwangmyeong in 1995. Its district office is located in front of Siheung Station, now Geumcheon-gu Office Station, in Siheung-dong.

Geumcheon-gu is located in the southwest corner of the city, south of the Han River. It is bordered on the west by the Anyang River, and partially on the east by Gwanak Mountain, a dominating part of Seoul's southern skyline.

Many technology companies are housed in Geumcheon-gu and several large headquarters are located here, albeit the income level of Seoulites here is lower than average. The Gyeongbu railway from Seoul Station to Busan station passes through, as well as Seoul Subway Lines 1 and 7.

The mayor of this district has been Cha Sung-su (차성수) since July 2010.

Administrative divisions

Gasan-dong (가산동 加山洞)
Doksan-dong (독산동 禿山洞)
Siheung-dong (시흥동 始興洞)

Welfare

Dreaming tree (Geumcheon-gu 'ggumna') 
Dreaming Tree (hereinafter referred to as ‘ggumna’) is a Hue cafe-a youth cultural space-operated by Geumcheon-gu Office.

Transportation

Railroad
Korail
Seoul Subway Line 1 (Gyeongbu Line)
(Guro-gu) ← Gasan Digital Complex—Doksan—Geumcheon-gu Office (formerly Siheung Sta.) → (Anyang)
Seoul Metropolitan Rapid Transit Corporation
Seoul Subway Line 7
(Guro-gu) ← Gasan Digital Complex → (Gwangmyeong)

See also
Gwanaksan

References

External links

Official site

Education Institutions

Universities Graduate Schools
Seoul University of Buddhism
Highschools
Geumcheon Highschool
Doksan Highschool
Dongil Girls' Highschool
Dongil Girls' Commercial Highschool
Moonil Highschool
Traditional Arts Highschool
Lifelong Education
Geongil Management Information Highschool

 
Districts of Seoul